Coreopsis latifolia is a North American species of flowering plant in the aster family known by the common name broad-leaved tickseed. It is native to the southeastern United States, primarily in the southern Appalachians of the states of Georgia, North Carolina, South Carolina, and Tennessee.

Description

The inflorescence is a corymb of flower heads, each with five phyllaries which may be over a centimeter long. The head contains yellow ray florets between 1 and 2 centimeters long and yellow disc florets. Flowering occurs in August and September.

Distribution
Coreopsis latifolia is native to the Blue Ridge Mountains, its distribution extending from the Great Craggy Mountains to the South Carolina line. Populations in Tennessee are disjunct. The plant grows in moist hardwood forest habitat on mafic rock such as amphibolite or hornblende gneiss. It can sometimes be seen on roadsides. In its range it is most abundant in North Carolina, but it is rare in general.

It is likely a relict species which had a wider distribution in the past.

Conservation
Coreopsis latifolia is threatened with the loss of its habitat, which is being consumed for development. It is a listed Vulnerable plant species. In some of its range it is considered to be stable and not declining quickly.

References

External links
United States Department of Agriculture Plants Profile: Coreopsis latifolia

latifolia
Flora of the Southeastern United States
Plants described in 1803